Canadian singer Michael Bublé has released eleven studio albums, three live albums, nine EPs, eighteen singles, and fourteen music videos. He has recorded for Warner Bros. Records, Reprise Records, and 143 Records. Bublé has sold over 75 million records worldwide, making him one of the best-selling Canadian artists in history. Billboard listed him as the 3rd Top Canadian Artist of all time (behind only Céline Dion and Shania Twain). He has scored 4 No. 1 albums on Billboard 200. He was listed by Billboard as the 47th Top Artist of 2010s decade. He also placed three albums on Billboard 200 Albums of the Decade which includes: Christmas (No. 24), To Be Loved (No. 179) and Crazy Love (No. 193). 

Bublé debuted independently in 1995 with his first EP, First Dance. In 2001 and 2002 he released the albums BaBalu and Dream respectively, without any record company support. In 2003, he signed a record deal with 143 Records and released his first studio album Michael Bublé, which was very successful. On May 23 of that year, he released his first live album, Come Fly with Me and later his second and third EPs, Totally Bublé and Let It Snow. On February 8, 2005, Bublé released his second album, entitled It's Time, which ended up with several certifications for its high sales. In the same year he issued his second live album Caught in the Act, launched a special Christmas edition of his self-titled studio album which obtained a silver certification in the UK and also his fourth EP, entitled More. His fifth EP, With Love, followed the next year and achieved a gold certification in the US.

In 2007, he released his third studio album, Call Me Irresponsible and the next year released his sixth EP, A Taste of Bublé. Bublé's third live album, Michael Bublé Meets Madison Square Garden, was released on July 16, 2009, and his fourth studio album, Crazy Love, saw release in October of the same year. In 2011, he released his fifth studio album, Christmas, which contained carols and collaborations with The Puppini Sisters, Thalía and Shania Twain. This album is considered the most prestigious of Bublé's because of its many certifications and is one of the best-selling albums of 2011. The same year he released the EP A Holiday Gift for You, which contains extra songs that were not included on the Christmas album. Bublé's seventh album, Nobody But Me was released on October 21, 2016. His eighth and latest album, Love, was released on November 16, 2018.

Albums

Studio albums

Live albums

Extended plays

Singles

Notes
 A Released as a limited edition single for Record Store Day 2012, therefore ineligible to chart
 B Released to promote Michael Bublé: Home for the Holidays, which features a performance of the song with Bing. Shania Twain appears on the album version

Other charted and certified songs

Holiday 100 chart entries
Since many radio stations in the US adopt a format change to Christmas music each December, many holiday hits have an annual spike in popularity during the last few weeks of the year and are retired once the season is over. In December 2011, Billboard began a Holiday Songs chart with 50 positions that monitors the last five weeks of each year to "rank the top holiday hits of all eras using the same methodology as the Hot 100, blending streaming, airplay, and sales data", and in 2013 the number of positions on the chart was doubled, resulting in the Holiday 100. Many Bublé recordings have made appearances on the Holiday 100 and are noted below according to the holiday season in which they charted there.

Other appearances

Music videos

Notes

References

Discographies of Canadian artists
Discography
Pop music discographies